Andrew's Field Airport is next to Molshoop in Overberg District Municipality, Western Cape, South Africa.

See also 
 List of airports in South Africa

References 

Airports in South Africa
Overberg District Municipality